Betta pinguis is a species of gourami endemic to Indonesia.  It is an inhabitant of forest streams.  This species grows to a length of  SL.  This fish is used by local peoples as bait.

References

pinguis
Taxa named by Maurice Kottelat
Fish described in 1998